Molyns is a surname. Notable people with the surname include:

Michael Molyns (born 1602), English politician
Michael Molyns (died 1615), English politician